is a former Japanese football player and manager.

Playing career
Sato was born in Tokyo on April 8, 1971. He joined Mitsubishi Motors (later Urawa Reds) in 1990. Although he played many matches in first season, his opportunity to play decreased and he left the club in 1993. In 1995, he joined Japan Football League club Fukushima FC. In 1996, he moved to Regional Leagues club Sony Sendai and played for the club until 2002.

Coaching career
Sato started coaching career at Sony Sendai in 2003. In 2004, he became a manager for the club and managed until 2007.

Club statistics

References

External links

reds.uijin.com

1971 births
Living people
Association football people from Tokyo
Japanese footballers
Japan Soccer League players
J1 League players
Japan Football League (1992–1998) players
Japan Football League players
Urawa Red Diamonds players
Fukushima FC players
Sony Sendai FC players
Association football midfielders